Annie Lacroix-Riz (born 18 October 1947) is a French historian, professor emeritus of modern history at the university Paris VII - Denis Diderot, specialist in the international relations in first half of the 20th century and collaboration. Her work concerns the political, economic and social history of the French Third Republic and Vichy Government, the relations between the Vatican and Reich,  as well as the strategy of the political elites and economic French before and after the Second World War. She is also known for her communist commitment. She denounces contemporary history under the alleged influence of the world of finance. However, she is criticized by many historians because she is considered politically biased, inclined to be revisionist about supposed communist crimes and a believer in the Synarchist conspiracy theory.

Works

Books 

 La CGT de la Libération à la scission (1944-1947), Paris, Éditions Sociales, 1983, 400 p.
 Le choix de Marianne: les relations franco-américaines de 1944 à 1948, Paris, Éditions Sociales, 1985, puis 1986, 222 p.
 Les Protectorats d’Afrique du Nord entre la France et Washington du débarquement à l'indépendance 1942-1956, Paris, L'Harmattan, 1988, 262 p.
 L'économie suédoise entre l'Est et l'Ouest 1944-1949: neutralité et embargo, de la guerre au Pacte Atlantique, L'Harmattan, 1991, 311 p.
 Le Vatican, l'Europe et le Reich de la Première Guerre mondiale à la Guerre Froide (1914-1955), Paris, Armand Colin, coll. « Références » Histoire, 1996, 540 p., puis édition complétée et révisée, 2010, 720 p.  
 Industrialisation et sociétés (1880-1970). L'Allemagne, Paris, Ellipses, 1997, 128 p.
 Industriels et banquiers français sous l'Occupation : la collaboration économique avec le Reich et Vichy, Paris, Armand Colin, coll. « Références » Histoire, 1999, 661 p. Completely revised edition 2007, .
 L'Histoire contemporaine sous influence, Paris, Le temps des Cerises, 2004 (1e, 120 p.), 2nd edition 2010 (145 p.) 
 Le Choix de la défaite : les élites françaises dans les années 1930, Paris, Armand Colin, 2006, 671 p., réimprimé en 2007 et 2008, puis, nouvelle édition complétée et révisée, 2010, 679 p. 
 L'intégration européenne de la France : La tutelle de l'Allemagne et des États-Unis, Paris, Pantin, Le temps des cerises, 2007, 108 p.
  De Munich à Vichy : L'assassinat de la Troisième République (1938-1940), Paris, Armand Colin, 2008, 408 p. 
 L’Histoire contemporaine toujours sous influence, Pantin, France, Éditions Le Temps des cerises, 2012, 263 p.
 Aux origines du carcan européen (1900–1960), Pantin, coédition Delga-Le temps des cerises, 2014, 197 p.

Selected articles 

 "Unitaires et Confédérés d'une réunification à l'autre (1934-1943)", Cahiers d'Histoire de l'Institut de recherches marxistes, N15, 1983, 31–58.
 "Les grandes banques françaises de la collaboration à l'épuration, 1940-1950. II - La non-épuration bancaire 1944-1950", Revue de la Seconde Guerre mondiale, N142, 1986, 81–101.
 "Le rôle du Vatican dans la colonisation de l'Afrique (1920-1938) : de la romanisation des Missions à la conquête de l'Éthiopie", Revue d’histoire moderne et contemporaine, N41-1, 1994, 29–81.
 "Les élites économiques françaises et la collaboration économique : la banque, l'industrie, Vichy et le Reich", Revue d'histoire de la Shoah. Le Monde Juif, N159, 1997, 8–123.
 "L'histoire commissionnée – un nouveau paradigme ?", Mouvements 3/2002 N21-N22, p. 135-142.
 "Quand les Américains voulaient gouverner la France", Le Monde diplomatique, mai 2003.
 Les comités d'organisation et l' Allemagne: tentative d' évaluation (2003/4) 
 "L'Union soviétique par pertes et profits", Le Monde diplomatique, mai 2005.
 Penser et construire l'Europe. Remarques sur la bibliographie de la question d'histoire contemporaine 2007-2009, La Pensée, N351, octobre-décembre 2007, 145-159.

Online 
 Quatre conférences novembre 2010, dans le cadre d'une "Université pour tous" à la médiathèque Louis Aragon de Bagneux (92) :  "Les débuts de l'intégration européenne, des années 1920 à l'après deuxième guerre mondiale".
 Présentation de l'historienne et de son travail, 2011, Les Films de l'An 2.
 Intervention sur Radio m Drôme
 Conférence mp3 article de montpellier-journal.fr, 2010.
 Emission Comaguer, radio galère, 2011. Voir aussi Les archives des Emissions de radio Comaguer.
 Conférence à propos de son livre Le Choix de la défaite, invitée par le parti Solidarité et progrès, 2006.
 Conférence mp3 en ligne tenue le 4 octobre 2008 à la maison de l’éducation populaire de Lille. Document enregistré et diffusé par le média du tiers secteur audiovisuel Passerellesud.org
 "Les concepts historiques tabous de l’historiographie dominante", Vidéo du Chspm, 2009.
 Intervention sur Polémix et la Voix Off sur la «Synarchie».

Footnotes

1947 births
Living people
20th-century French historians
21st-century French historians